The 2007 Reading Borough Council election was held on 3 May 2007, at the same time as other local elections across England and Scotland. Sixteen of the 46 seats on Reading Borough Council were up for election, being the usual third of the council plus a by-election in Church ward where Labour councillor Azam Janjua had resigned. Labour lost seven seats on the council, with the Conservatives gaining six seats and the Liberal Democrats one seat. Despite these losses, Labour retained a majority on the council.

Results

Ward results
The results in each ward were as follows (candidates with an asterisk* were the sitting councillor standing for re-election):

References

2007 English local elections
2007